Liparis bristolensis is a marine fish from the genus Liparis. It lives in the demersal zone at a depth between thirty-one to seventy-seven meters. The species may be found in the Northwest Pacific Ocean, specifically in the South Bering Sea and the western Gulf of Alaska.

References

Liparis (fish)
Fish described in 1912